Chaetocladus is an extinct non-calcifying genus of unicellular green algae known from the Upper Silurian.

Morphology
Chaetocladus thalli range from 2–6 cm in height and average 1 cm in diameter. They comprise a parallel-sided, unbranching axis which is surrounded by leaf-like ramifications.

Fossil record
Chaetocladus is known from upper Silurian konservat lagerstätte, and found in association with other algae, arthropods, and annelid worms.
Similar Dasycladean algae are reported from late-Ordovician lagerstatte.

Classification
Due to its morphological similarity to the extant order Dasycladales, Chaetocladus is considered to be an early cousin of this order.  Unlike the majority of Dasycladales, Chaetocladus does not form deposit calcite - therefore it required much rarer taphonomic conditions to be preserved.
Some genera now recognised as Chaetocladus were originally described as Graptolites.

Species 
C. capitatus 
C. dubius 
C. gracilis 
C. hefteri 
C. plumula 
C. ruedemanni

References

Ordovician plants
Silurian plants
Devonian plants
Fossil algae
Ulvophyceae genera
Middle Ordovician first appearances
Middle Devonian genus extinctions
Fossil taxa described in 1997